Khaneh Shur Rural District is a rural district (dehestan) in the Central District of Salas-e Babajani County, Kermanshah Province, Iran. At the 2006 census, its population was 7,623, in 1,615 families. The rural district has 46 villages.

References 

Rural Districts of Kermanshah Province
Salas-e Babajani County